Egire Paavurama is a 1997 Indian Telugu-language romantic comedy film, produced by P. Usharani under the Chandra Kiran Films banner, presented by Sri Sravanthi Movies and directed by S. V. Krishna Reddy. The film stars Srikanth, Laila and J. D. Chakravarthy, with music composed by S. V. Krishna Reddy. It is a remake of the Malayalam film Sallapam.

Cast 

 J. D. Chakravarthy as Siva
 Srikanth as Balasubrahmanyam
 Laila as Jyothi
 Suhasini Maniratnam as Yasodha
 Nirmalamma as Jyothi's grandmother; Siva's mother
 Kota Srinivasa Rao
 Brahmanandam
 Babu Mohan
 Tanikella Bharani as Simhachalam
 Charan Raj as Yasodha's husband
 Sivaji Raja
 Chittibabu as Simhachalam's assistant
 Gundu Hanumantha Rao as Simhachalam's assistant
 Kallu Chidambaram as Simhachalam's assistant
 Gautam Raju as Simhachalam's assistant
 Subbaraya Sharma as Jyothi's father
 Y. Vijaya as Saraswati
 Jenny as Saraswati's husband
 Akkiraju Sundara Rama Krishna as Saraswati's brother; Balasubramanyam's master
 Sri Lakshmi
 Jhansi as Saraswati's daughter
 Kalpana
 Swathi
 Baby Shravanthi
 Master Siddarth

Soundtrack

Reception 
A critic from Andhra Today opined that "The director does not portray how the ensuing conflict develops between the characters of the love triangle. The main story seems to have been sidelined with the comedy track gaining in prominence".

References

External links 
 

1990s Telugu-language films
1997 films
1997 romantic comedy films
Films directed by S. V. Krishna Reddy
Films scored by S. V. Krishna Reddy
Indian romantic comedy films
Telugu remakes of Malayalam films